Geevagh is a Gaelic Athletic Association club based in the parish of Geevagh, in the south east of Sligo, Ireland.

History
Geevagh was founded in 1886.

Notable players
Pat Hughes

Honours
 Sligo Intermediate Football Championship: (5)
 1984, 1986, 1999, 2006, 2009
 Sligo Junior Football Championship: (4)
 1936, 1974, 1981, 1998
 Sligo Junior B Football Championship: (1)
 2011
 Sligo Minor Football Championship: (1)
 1979
 Sligo Senior Football League (Division 2): (1)
 2008
 Sligo Intermediate Football League Division 3 (ex Div. 2): (2)
 1984, 2007
 Sligo Junior Football League (Division 5): (1)
 1981
 Kiernan Cup: (1)
 2001
 Benson Cup: (1)
 1998

References

Gaelic games clubs in County Sligo